This is the list of the 16 members of the European Parliament for Denmark in the 1979 to 1984 session.

List

Notes

Sources
List of Danish MEPs (in Danish)

1979
List
Denmark